The women's 49 kg competition in taekwondo at the 2021 Islamic Solidarity Games will held on 10 August at the Selcuk University 19 Mayis Sport Hall in Konya.

Results 
 Legend
 PTG — Won by Points Gap
 SUP — Won by superiority
 OT — Won on over time (Golden Point)
 DQ — Won by disqualification
 PUN — Won by punitive declaration
 WD — Won by withdrawal

Main Bracket

References

W49